The Braddock Nunataks are a group of prominent nunataks located inland from Bertram Glacier and  southeast of Perseus Crags on the west margin of the Dyer Plateau, in Palmer Land. They were mapped by the United States Geological Survey in 1974, and named by the Advisory Committee on Antarctic Names for Lieutenant Robert L. Braddock, Jr., CEC, U.S. Navy, Officer-in-Charge of the South Pole Station in 1974.

References 

Nunataks of Palmer Land